The 1967–68 Denver Pioneers men's ice hockey team represented University of Denver in college ice hockey. In its 12th year under head coach Murray Armstrong the team compiled a 28–5–1 record and reached the NCAA tournament for the seventh time. The Pioneers defeated North Dakota 4–0 in the championship game at the Duluth Arena Auditorium in Duluth, Minnesota, the third championship meeting between he two teams. Gerry Powers recorded the first shutout in the championship game and tied the record for lowest tournament goals against average (0.50).

Season
Denver opened their season looking for revenge against North Dakota who had ended their campaign the year before. After earning a split on the road the Pioneers went east, winning a game against Minnesota–Duluth before continuing onto Houghton to take on perennial power Michigan Tech. The Huskies stymied Denver in both games, holding the Pioneers to single goal in each and putting Denver under .500 both overall and in conference. Denver returned home and began to climb out the hole the following week with a pair of wins over Michigan followed by an easy win over NAIA Bemidji State.

Denver spent their winter holiday playing in the Broadmoor World Tournament against four different national teams who were gearing up for the 1968 Winter Olympics. Denver went 1–2–1 in the series but acquitted themselves well against strong competition. The experience against the national teams helped the Pioneers go on a streak unparalleled in the history of the program. Denver won two games against the visiting Alberta Golden Bears before returning to their conference schedule and began to run roughshod over the opposition. Denver's offence, which had played well over the first part of the season, exploded after the new year and would score no fewer than 3 goals in their remaining 22 contests. The defense too buckled down and the Gerry Powers would only surrender more than three goals once in their remaining contests.

Denver would spend the final five weeks of the regular season at home and use that to their advantage by winning 17 straight games to enter the WCHA playoffs as the top seed, having defeated North Dakota and Michigan Tech by a combined 27–6 to guarantee their WCHA championship. Denver opened the conference tournament at home against UMD and dispatched the bulldogs 11–4 before hosting Minnesota in the second round. This was the first meeting between the two all season due to the Gopher's continued refusal to play Denver because of their recruiting conflict but the lack of familiarity didn't hamper Denver in the slightest and the Pioneers won the series 16–3.

With another WCHA championship under their belt Denver was given the top western seed in the 1968 NCAA Tournament and opened against Boston College at the Duluth Arena Auditorium. Powers showed up to play in the National Tournament and held BC to a single goal, ensuring that Denver's 4 goals would send the program to its 6th title game. In the final Denver met North Dakota once more and two western powers battled for the championship. Powers and his counterpart Mike Curran both kept the game scoreless through two periods of play but Bob Trembecky broke the tie with a power play marker early in the third. Denver kept its attack going, firing a total of 14 shots in the final frame with three more finding the back of the net, while North Dakota faltered and was unable to score. Denver's 4–0 win was their fourth championship and the first time that any team was shutout in the title game. The win was also Denver 22nd straight victory, a program record both overall and for one season.

For tying the NCAA record by allowing only 1 goal in the tournament, Gerry Powers won the tournament MOP and was named to the All-Tournament first team along with Keith Magnuson and Trembecky. Tim Gould, Jim Wiste and Tom Gilmore made the second team. Magnuson and Wiste were named to the AHCA All-American West Team and the All-WCHA First Team while Powers and Cliff Koroll made the All-WCHA Second Team. Magnuson was named as the WCHA Most Valuable Player while Murray Armstrong won his second WCHA Coach of the Year award.

Standings

Schedule

|-
!colspan=12 style="color:white; background:#862633; " | Exhibition

|-
!colspan=12 style="color:white; background:#862633; " | Regular Season

|-
!colspan=12 style="color:white; background:#862633; " | 

|-
!colspan=12 style="color:white; background:#862633; " |

Roster and scoring statistics

Goaltending statistics

1968 championship game

(W1) Denver vs. (W2) North Dakota

References

Denver Pioneers men's ice hockey seasons
Denver
Denver
Denver
Denver
Denver
Denver